Tropic Skincare is a British online and multi-level marketing company which sells skincare and cosmetic products. The company is based in Sutton, South London, where it designs, manufactures, markets, and distributes its products. The business is jointly owned by Apprentice series 7 runner-up Susie Ma, and entrepreneur and Apprentice host, Lord Alan Sugar.

History
Tropic was informally established in 2004, when founder Susan Ma aged 15, sold a single body care product in Greenwich market, inspired by her upbringing of Tropical North Queensland. The company officially became incorporated in 2011. After Susan Ma took part in the seventh series of The Apprentice, Alan Sugar invested to become a 50/50 partner in Tropic. In 2013, Tropic launched its Social Selling Business Platform with 400 founding sales people. Tropic has since increased its product range to include skincare, body care, hair care, sun care, tanning serums and products designed for men.

Business structure
Tropic uses a direct sales and multi-level marketing business model, in which sales people are paid for selling and for sales made by people they recruit or sponsor. Sales people host party plan events where products are demonstrated or sampled and orders are taken from customers. Sales people also can attend commercial events and have personal web-shops, where products are sold online.

"Ambassadors" earn a 25% commission on products they sell themselves, and advance through the "qualifications" ("ambassador", "manager", and "executive manager") set out in the Success Plan.  The terms and conditions sellers sign requires that ambassadors only buy stock to sell for genuine customer orders, rather than purely to advance levels. It also caps Ambassador's stock capacity to 20 items at any one time. There are no volume requirements to earn commission.

Ingredients
Tropic's products are composed of naturally derived ingredients. Tropic's products do not contain parabens, alcohol, gluten, synthetic preservatives, or sodium lauryl sulfate. All products are vegan, and many contain essential oils such as bergamot oil, rosehip oil, in conjunction with aloe vera juice and shea butter, which are also prevalent throughout the range.

Ethics 
Tropic is certified by the Vegan Society, PETA, and Cruelty Free International. and is a CarbonNeutral and Ethically accredited company

Press

Tropic took part in the 2017, Sunday Times Virgin Fast Track 100 'Emerging Brands' conference.

Tropic has featured on the Fast Track 100 for five consecutive years.

References

Manufacturing companies based in London
Companies established in 2011
British brands
Cosmetics brands
Cosmetics companies of the United Kingdom